Morgonbris, full title Morgonbris: arbeterskornas tidning (meaning "Morning Breeze: Journal for working women"), is the magazine of the Social Democratic Women in Sweden.

The magazine was founded by the Women's Trade Union in 1904. The founding editors were two Swedish political activists, Anna Sterky and Maria Sandel. It is still in publication.

References

External links
Editions of Morgonbris 1904–1936 digitized by Gothenburg University Library
WorldCat record

1904 establishments in Sweden
Feminism in Sweden
Feminist magazines
Magazines established in 1904
Socialist magazines
Swedish-language magazines
Women's magazines published in Sweden